Hydnophlebia chrysorhiza, also known as Phanerochaete chrysorhizon is a species of crust fungus in family Meruliaceae, being the type species of genus Hydnophlebia. It is  a white rot organism which infects dead deciduous trees.

This taxon was originally described as Hydnum chrysorhizum by Amos Eaton in 1817.

References

External links 
 Mushroom Observer - P. chrysorhizon

Fungal tree pathogens and diseases
Hydnophlebia chrysorhiza
Fungi described in 1822